Football Club Abdysh-Ata Kant is a Kyrgyz football club based in Kant. It is named after a local brewery. The club was founded in 1992.

History

Names
1992: Founded as FC Tunguch Kant.
2000: Renamed to FC Abdysh-Ata Kant

Domestic history

Farm club 
FC Nashe Pivo a farm club of FC Abdish-Ata Kant.

Honours 
Kyrgyz Premier League
Winners (1): 2022

Kyrgyzstan Cup
Winners (5): 2007, 2009, 2011, 2015, 2022
Kyrgyzstan Super Cup
Winners (1): 2016
Ala-Too Cup
Winners (1): 2010

Players

Current squad

Managerial history
 Aleksandr Kalashnikov (2006)
 Nematjan Zakirov (2007–08)
 Ceylan Arikan (Feb 2009–10)
 Murat Jumakeyev (interim) (2011)
 Islam Akhmedov (2011)
 Nematjan Zakirov (2011–12)
 Islam Akhmedov (Jul 2012–12)
 Mirlan Eshenov (2013–16)

References

External links 
Career stats by KLISF
Profile at sport.kg
Abdysh-Ata page – Sport.kg
Summer transfers 2012

Football clubs in Kyrgyzstan
Association football clubs established in 2000
Chüy Region